Colchicum balansae is a variable species producing white to rosy-purple flowers in fall.  The flowers are borne low to the ground, but can come from bulbs 50 cm (20") below the soil surface. The leaves are absent at flowering time, and start growing in the spring and can reach up to 30 cm (12") long.  This species is native to southern Turkey and to Greece (Attica, Poros, Rhodes).

References

balansae
Flora of Greece
Flora of Turkey
Garden plants
Plants described in 1855